The University of Massachusetts Amherst School of Public Policy is a school at the University of Massachusetts Amherst. Formerly known and operated as the Center for Public Policy & Administration, the center was elevated to a school in 2016 to reflect its expanding mission. The school offers an undergraduate major in Public Policy and professional master's degrees in Public Affairs (one-year MPA) and in Public Policy & Administration (two-year MPPA). In October 2019, the school announced a five-year expansion plan that included the creation of an undergraduate public policy major which launched in the Fall of 2022 as well expansion of the faculty through tenure lines for faculty appointments solely in the School of Public Policy.

Alumni includes Amy Ferrer, Director of the American Philosophical Association.

References

External links 
 https://www.umass.edu/spp/

University of Massachusetts Amherst schools
University subdivisions in Massachusetts